The therapeutic approach to philosophy sees philosophical problems as misconceptions that are to be therapeutically dissolved. The approach stems from Ludwig Wittgenstein.

Some noted philosophers who can be said to take a therapeutic approach are John McDowell, Alice Crary, and Richard Rorty. Quietists, philosophers associated with The New Wittgenstein and anti-philosophy are all pertinent to the therapeutic approach.

Hans-Johann Glock has argued against the plausibility of the therapeutic approach as accurately characterizing Wittgenstein's philosophy. Hans Sluga and Rupert Read have advocated a "post-therapeutic" or "liberatory" interpretation of Wittgenstein.

See also
Existential therapy
Philosophical counseling

References

Philosophical methodology
Ludwig Wittgenstein
Metaphilosophy